In algebraic geometry and number theory, the torsion conjecture or uniform boundedness conjecture for torsion points for abelian varieties states that the order of the torsion group of an abelian variety over a number field can be bounded in terms of the dimension of the variety and the number field. A stronger version of the conjecture is that the torsion is bounded in terms of the dimension of the variety and the degree of the number field. The torsion conjecture has been completely resolved in the case of elliptic curves.

Elliptic curves

From 1906 to 1911, Beppo Levi published a series of papers investigating the possible finite orders of points on elliptic curves over the rationals. He showed that there are infinitely many elliptic curves over the rationals with the following torsion groups:
 Cn with 1 ≤ n ≤ 10, where Cn denotes the cyclic group of order n;
 C12;
 C2n × C2 with 1 ≤ n ≤ 4, where × denotes the direct sum.
At the 1908 International Mathematical Congress in Rome, Levi conjectured that this is a complete list of torsion groups for elliptic curves over the rationals.

 drew the connection between the torsion conjecture for elliptic curves over the rationals and the theory of classical modular curves. In the early 1970s, the work of Gérard Ligozat, Daniel Kubert, Barry Mazur, and John Tate showed that several small values of n do not occur as orders of torsion points on elliptic curves over the rationals.  proved the full torsion conjecture for elliptic curves over the rationals. Finally,  proved the conjecture for elliptic curves over any number field.

A complete list of possible torsion groups has also been given for elliptic curves over quadratic number fields. There are substantial partial results for quartic and quintic number fields .

See also
 Bombieri–Lang conjecture
 Uniform boundedness conjecture for preperiodic points
 Uniform boundedness conjecture for rational points

References

Bibliography

Abelian varieties
Conjectures
Diophantine geometry
Theorems in number theory
Theorems in algebraic geometry